Damir Imamović (born 1978) is a Bosnian musician, singer, composer and author of the traditional music of Bosnia and Herzegovina, "sevdalinka" or "sevdah". The winner of "The Best Artist of Europe" in 2021 Songlines World Music Awards.

Early life
Imamović was born in Sarajevo, Bosnia and Herzegovina into a musical family. His father Nedžad Imamović (1948-2020), is a bass player, producer, singer and author, while his paternal grandfather Zaim Imamović (1920–1994), was a legendary musician and traditional Bosnian folk singer, famous in the 1940s and 1960s. Damir spent his formative years (1992–1995) living in the besieged city of Sarajevo. He picked up playing guitar when he was 15. Later on he studied philosophy.

Damir's teachers (apart from the family ties) were Spaso Berak (multiinstrumentalist and sevdah arranger for Himzo Polovina), Hašim Muharemović (saz player), Emina Zečaj (legendary sevdah singer) and others.

Career
Imamović held his first concert in The Art Gallery of Bosnia and Herzegovina, in Sarajevo, in 2004. Soon after he played numerous concerts in Bosnia and Herzegovina and in the region of the former Yugoslavia, after the first CD with his Damir Imamović Trio was released in 2006. His most acclaimed CD was "Abrašević Live" which was to appear in 2008. It won him the "Davorin" music award of Bosnia and Herzegovina, as well as numerous international tours and performances in important festivals such as: Druga Godba (Slovenia), Jazz Fest Sarajevo (BIH). The "Abrašević Live" also features Damir's first sevdah compositions based on the traditional lyrics "Dva se draga".

Bosnian/Croatian film maker Marina Andree-Škop made a documentary film "Sevdah" alongside Damir's work in sevdah which renewed interest of younger audiences in this ancient art. The film won Sarajevo Film Festival's Audience award "The Heart of Sarajevo" in 2009.

Damir's solo albums feature a bit different, more intimate style. His solo concerts in the gardens of Sarajevo during summer months became a very sought-after act, so he released the album of live performances: Svrzina Kuća, on 9 October 2011 by the Sarajevo-based record label iTM. The album consists of live recordings from his performances on 27 and 28 July 2011 in the house of Svrzo in Sarajevo.

In 2012 Damir formed Damir Imamović's Sevdah Takht, consisting of Ivan Mihajlović (el. bass, from Belgrade) and Nenad Kovačić (percussion, from Zagreb). The trio appeared in the most important music festival in Europe: Druga Godba (Slovenia), Balkan Trafik (Belgium), Culturscapes (Switzerland), TFF Rudolstadt (Germany). In 2015 the band was joined by Ivana Djurić, a Sarajevo-based violinist.

The band had their showcase concert at the WOMEX 2015 festival in Budapest.

The quartet was signed by the Glitterbeat Records in 2015, and their first album will be released internationally on 29 April 2016. The first single "Sarajevo" was released on 13 February 2016.

Damir Imamović is a dedicated sevdah researcher, educator and a producer. In 2014 he produced and released an album "The Art of Saz" by Ćamil Metiljević, sevdah master of older generation. He also produced a young saz player's debut "The house of saz" by Jusuf Brkić.

Research, education, authorship 

 "Sevdah" a book on history of the sevdah genre by Damir Imamović (Vrijeme, Zenica, B-H, 2016; in English in 2017)
 "Sevdah, the art of freedom", a multimedia exhibition by Damir Imamović (Art Gallery of Bosnia and Herzegovina, Sarajevo, November 2015).
 SevdahLab, an educational program on history, performance and studies of the genre of sevdah (sevdalinka) by Damir Imamović (since 2013). SevdahLab lectures and workshops were held around the world.

Discography
with Damir Imamović Trio
Svira Standarde (buybook, 2006) 
Abrašević live (samizdat, 2008)
Solo
Damir Imamović (Gramofon, 2010)
Svrzina Kuća (iTM, The House of Svrzo, 2011)
with Sevdah Takt
Sevdah Takht (iTM, 2012)
Dvojka (Glitterbeat Records, 2016), produced by Chris Eckman
with Ivana Djuric, Derya Türkan and Greg Cohen (produced by Joe Boyd and Andrea Goertler)
Singer of Tales (Wrasse Records, 2020), the album was proclaimed "The Best European World Music Album" by Transglobal World Music Annual Charts in 2020.

References

External links

 Damir Imamović: "No to fascists and homophobes", Guardian feature on Damir, May 2021
 Artist profiles: Damir Imamović, worldmusiccentral.org, June 2020
 "Meet Damir Imamović: The King of Sevdah Music", The Huffington Post interview, September 2015
Damir Imamović at Discogs

1978 births
Living people
Musicians from Sarajevo
Sevdalinka
Bosniaks of Bosnia and Herzegovina
Bosnia and Herzegovina atheists
21st-century Bosnia and Herzegovina male singers